William Topley may refer to:

 William James Topley (1845–1931), Canadian photographer
 William Topley (geologist) (1841–1894), British geologist
 William Whiteman Carlton Topley (1886–1944), British bacteriologist
 William Topley (musician), British musician